The J. A. Johnson Blacksmith Shop is a historic commercial building in Rothsay, Minnesota, United States.  It is one of Minnesota's most intact early-20th-century blacksmith shops, and still contains a large portion of its original, handforged equipment.  The shop was listed on the National Register of Historic Places in 1996 for its local significance in the theme of commerce.  It was nominated for being a rare intact example of the style of blacksmith shop once common to small Midwestern farming communities in the first half of the 20th century.

See also
 National Register of Historic Places listings in Wilkin County, Minnesota

References

External links
 

1903 establishments in Minnesota
American blacksmiths
Blacksmith shops
Buildings and structures in Wilkin County, Minnesota
Commercial buildings completed in 1903
Commercial buildings on the National Register of Historic Places in Minnesota
National Register of Historic Places in Wilkin County, Minnesota